The 1924 Primera División was the 24th. season of top-flight football in Uruguay. This was organised by official body, Uruguayan Football Association (AUF), while dissident body, Uruguayan Football Federation (FUF), organised its own championship simultaneously.

Overview 
The tournament consisted of a round-robin championship. It involved twelve teams, and the champion was Nacional (third consecutively).

Teams

League standings

See also
 1924 Uruguayan Primera División of FUF

External links 
 Uruguay – List of final tables 1900–2000 on RSSSF

Uruguayan Primera División seasons
Uru
1924 in Uruguayan football